The Middle East Journal is a quarterly peer-reviewed academic journal published by the Middle East Institute (Washington, D.C.). It was established in 1947 and covers research on the modern Middle East, including political, economic, and social developments and historical events in North Africa, the Middle East, Caucasus, and Central Asia. Jacob Passel is the current editor.

History 
The Middle East Institute was founded in 1946 to promote the study of the region in a modern, policy-relevant context. From its outset, one of its priorities was "[t]he editing and publishing of an authoritative journal on Middle Eastern affairs." Accordingly, the first issue of the journal appeared in January 1947.

Current Contributors
Jacob Passel is the current editor. The current Book Review Editor is John Calabrese.

The Board of Advisory Editors include:

 Madawi Al-Rasheed
 Omar Ashour
 Henri Barkey
 Sheila Carapico
 Michael Collins Dunn
 Anoush Ehteshami
 Jean-Pierre Filiu
 F. Gregory Gause, III
 Michael M. Gunter
 Steven Heydemann
 J. N. C. Hill
 Frederic C. Hof
 Marc Lynch
 J. E. Peterson
 Michael W. S. Ryan
 Sabri Sayarı
 Samer S. Shehata
 Gareth Stansfield
 Robert Springborg
 Gönül Tol
 Edward (Ned) Walker
 Marvin G. Weinbaum
Paul Salem
Ross Harrison

Abstracting and indexing
The journal is abstracted and indexed in the Book Review Index, Current Contents/Social & Behavioral Sciences, EBSCO databases, Index Islamicus, International Political Science Abstracts, ProQuest databases, Scopus, and the Social Sciences Citation Index. According to the Journal Citation Reports, the journal has a 2015 impact factor of 0.605.

References

External links

Middle Eastern studies in the United States
Middle Eastern studies journals
Quarterly journals
Publications established in 1947
1947 establishments in Washington, D.C.
English-language journals